is a Japanese photographer. Tsuda has published works focused on subjects in Chicago, Osaka, and Tokyo. His work has been exhibited in Japan, Italy, and the United States. He has been recognized for his work documenting the Latino residents of the Pilsen neighborhood of Chicago in the early 1990s.

Biography
Tsuda was born in 1966 in Hamamatsu in Shizuoka Prefecture.

In 1989, Tsuda left Japan for the United States on a work visa, and lived in Winnetka, Illinois for a short time. He then moved to the Pilsen neighborhood of Chicago and studied photography at Columbia College Chicago. One of Tsuda's school projects at Columbia was to document his neighborhood, and his work depicted some of the streets between Halsted Street to Western Avenue and 16th Street to Cermak Road. These works were first made available in a self-published book called made me better than before, which had limited circulation and promptly sold out. Tsuda created a second edition of the book called Pilsen Days in 2016 after getting feedback from Pilsen residents.

Exhibitions and recognition
Tsuda's work has been exhibited in Milan, Tokyo, and Chicago. In May 2001, Tsuda won the Hitotsuboten, a Tokyo-based annual contest for graphic design and photography for his solo exhibition titled .

References

Japanese photographers
1966 births
Living people
People from Hamamatsu